Scotinotylus alienus is a species of sheet weaver found in Alaska, Canada and Russia. It was described by Kulczynski in 1885.

References

Linyphiidae
Fauna of Alaska
Spiders of Russia
Spiders of North America
Spiders described in 1885